Ben Meek (born June 2, 1981 in Wabash, Indiana) is an American soccer player who last played for the Charlotte Eagles of the USL Second Division.

Career

College and amateur

Meek grew up in Claremont, California and played college soccer at Westmont College, where he earned All-American (HM), Region II and All-Conference honors and was the team's defensive MVP.  As a defender he played in over 77 games for the Warriors and scored 13 goals and added 13 assists.  During his college years he also spent four years playing with the Southern California Seahorses in the USL Premier Development League.

Professional

Undrafted out of college, Meek signed with the Charlotte Eagles in the USL Second Division in 2004.  He played an integral role in the team’s defense leading to three consecutive Championship Finals and a USL Second Division Championship in 2005  where Meek was named the Championship Game MVP scoring the game tying goal and game winning penalty kick.  Meek had a brief stint with the Colorado Rapids reserve team of Major League Soccer (MLS) as a guest player at the end of the 2006 season.

See also
NAIA national men's soccer championship

References

External links 
http://www.charlotteeagles.com
https://web.archive.org/web/20111130155825/http://www.soccertimes.com/proleagues/usl2/2005/aug27
http://www.oursportscentral.com/services/releases/?id=3350386

1981 births
Living people
American soccer players
Charlotte Eagles players
USL Second Division players
USL League Two players
Southern California Seahorses players
Soccer players from Indiana
Association football defenders